The Age of Magic is a 2014 novel by Nigerian writer Ben Okri. It won the Bad Sex in Fiction Award in 2014.

References

Novels by Ben Okri
Postcolonial novels
Nigerian magic realism novels
Nigerian fantasy novels
2014 Nigerian novels
Head of Zeus books